Bursaria cayzerae is a species of flowering plant in the family Pittosporaceae and is endemic to the North Coast of New South Wales. It is a sparsely-branched shrub with spiny branches, narrowly elliptic leaves, flowers with five glabrous sepals, spreading white petals and five stamens, and flattened fruit.

Description

Taxonomy
Bursaria cayzerae was first formally described in 2013 by Ian Telford and Lachlan Mackenzie Copeland in the journal Telopea from specimens collected near Grafton in 2012. The specific epithet (cayzerae) honours Lindy W. Cayzer for her work on the Pittosporaceae.

Distribution and habitat
This bursaria is only known from near Grafton on the North Coast of New South Wales where it grows in shrubby woodland.

References

cayzerae
Pittosporaceae
Plants described in 2013
Flora of New South Wales